Deathless may refer to:

 Immortal, having eternal life
 Deathless (Throwdown album), 2009
 Deathless (Revocation album), 2014
 Deathless (Miss May I album), 2015
 Deathless (novel), a fantasy novel by Catherynne M. Valente

See also
 Lifeless (disambiguation)